Formulli is a village in Chach Valley of Attock District in Punjab Province of Pakistan.

 The primarily population is Pashtoon and Pukhto is widely spoken among the people. the main tribes are adal khel,babu khel,rehamdad khel,and Jalal khel.

References

Villages in Attock District